Maksim Belov (born 23 April 1999) is a Belarusian professional footballer who plays for Neman Grodno.

References

External links 
 
 

1999 births
Living people
People from Lida
Sportspeople from Grodno Region
Belarusian footballers
Association football goalkeepers
FC Dnepr Mogilev players
FC Dnyapro Mogilev players
FC Shakhtyor Soligorsk players
FC Neman Grodno players